Springerville volcanic field is a monogenetic volcanic field located in east-central Arizona between Springerville and Show Low.

The field is located towards the western end of the Jemez Lineament.

Notable vents

Economic resources
The St. Johns carbon dioxide reservoir is located in the northwest part of the Springerville volcanic field and has estimated reserves of 445 billion cubic meters. Effort since the mid-1990s to either extract helium from the reservoir or to ship carbon dioxide to the Permian Basinc for enhanced oil recovery have not come to fruition. A more recent US Department of Energy proposal is to use carbon dioxide from the reservoir as a heat exchange fluid for extraction of geothermal energy from the volcanic field.

See also
 List of volcanoes in the United States

References

External links
 

Volcanic fields of Arizona
Landforms of Apache County, Arizona
Monogenetic volcanic fields
White Mountains (Arizona)
Pleistocene volcanism